Waterlogging or water logging may refer to:

 Waterlogging (agriculture), saturation of the soil by groundwater sufficient to prevent or hinder agriculture
 Waterlogging (archeology), the exclusion of air from an archeological site by groundwater, preserving artifacts
 Underwater logging, the process of harvesting trees that are submerged under water
 Watered stock, an asset with artificially high value

Waterlog may refer to:

 Waterlog: A Swimmer's Journey Through Britain, a 1999 book by Roger Deakin